is a railway station on the Kominato Line in Ichihara, Chiba, Japan, operated by the third-sector railway operator Kominato Railway.

Lines
Tsukizaki Station is served by the Kominato Railway Kominato Line, and lies 29.8 km from the western terminus of the line at Goi Station.

Station layout
The station has a single side platform serving a bidirectional single track. There is an additional island platform next to the running line, but this is now disused. The old, wooden, station building is unstaffed, and has a waiting room only, and no ticket gate.

Platforms

Adjacent stations

History
The station opened on September 1, 1926. It has been unstaffed since 1 April 1967.

Passenger statistics
In fiscal 2010, the station was used by an average of 5 passengers daily (boarding passengers only).

See also
 List of railway stations in Japan

References

External links

  

Railway stations in Chiba Prefecture
Railway stations in Japan opened in 1926